Yvonne Wilder (born Yvonne Othon, September 21, 1937 – November 24, 2021) was an American actress, comedian, writer, and artist. She appeared in West Side Story on stage and in the 1961 film, and had a busy career in American television from the 1960s into the 1990s.

Early life 
Yvonne Othon was born in the Bronx, New York City. Her parents were from Cuba and Puerto Rico, but Othon did not learn to speak Spanish as a child. She attended the High School for Performing Arts, with further training at the Royal Academy of Dramatic Art in London.

Career 
As a young actress and dancer, Yvonne Othon appeared in shows starring Imogene Coca and Carol Burnett. While she was studying in London, Othon appeared in a West End production of West Side Story, and later played Anita in the first international touring company of the show. Othon's first screen credit was as Consuelo in West Side Story (1961). She and Rita Moreno were among the few Puerto Rican performers playing Puerto Rican characters in the film, and they both worked with Natalie Wood on her accent as Maria. She attended some reunion events related to West Side Story. "She was a worldly, wiseass New Yorker, intelligent and very funny," recalled her friend and fellow dancer from West Side Story, actress Nobuko Miyamoto. 

Wilder was also known for roles in the vampire film, The Return of Count Yorga (1971), which she co-wrote; and in Silent Movie (1976), Bloodbrothers (1978), Why Not Stay for Breakfast? (1979), The Last Married Couple in America (1980), and Seems Like Old Times (1980).  

Most of Wilder's work was in television, including roles in Hennesey (1962), CBS Workshop (1964), Hey, Landlord (1967), Bracken's World (1969), Room 222 (1969–1970), The Mary Tyler Moore Show (1972), The Courtship of Eddie's Father (1972), The Partridge Family (1971–1972), The Girl with Something Extra (1973), Death Sentence (1974), On the Rocks (1975–1976), The Practice (1976), Police Story (1977), Operation Petticoat (1977–1978), The Tenth Month (1979), One Day at a Time (1979), Archie Bunker's Place (1981–1982), Mama's Family (1983), Gimme a Break! (1986–1987), 227 (1988), The Equalizer (1986–1989), and Full House (1988–1991).

Wilder was also half of a comedy duo with Jack Colvin. Later in life, she was a painter and sculptor, and wrote a play, Weehawken, performed in Los Angeles in 1988.

Personal life 
Wilder married five times. Her third husband was Bob Kelljan (Robert Kelluchian). Her fifth husband was Zach Kleiman. She had one son, Chris. She died at home in Los Angeles on November 24, 2021, at the age of 84.

References

External links 
 
 Yvonne Othon Wilder's website
Colvin & Wilder on The Hollywood Palace In 1964, on YouTube
Colvin & Wilder on Gimme a Break!, on YouTube

1937 births
2021 deaths
American actresses
American dancers
Fiorello H. LaGuardia High School alumni
American people of Cuban descent
American people of Puerto Rican descent
American comedians
People from the Bronx